Espresso Logic is the thirteenth studio album by British singer-songwriter Chris Rea, released in 1993. The US edition of the album has a significantly different track listing, featuring two songs (God's Great Banana Skin and Miles Is A Cigarette) from Rea's previous album, God's Great Banana Skin, which was not released in the US, along with If You Were Me, a track recorded with Elton John for his 1993 Duets release. The cover art of the US edition is the same as the UK single Espresso Logic. The song Julia was dedicated to his daughter Julia Christina, who was four years old at the time.

Critical reception
A "refined, elegant, rock style" characterizes the record, which continues Rea's '90s run of "commercially successful and critically acclaimed albums". A review in Guitar Player finds that "Rea immediately declares his multi-ethnic impulses", as the title track begins with his "languidly atmospheric slide guitar shimmering like the Pacific Ocean under a full Oahu moon. Then Davy Spillane's mournful Uillean pipes inject Celtic melancholy, and the two instruments interweave throughout the track, accompanied by a Brazilian-inflected tribal rhythm, until they are nearly indistinguishable from one another." Rea recorded the album using the two '62 Fender Stratocasters, plugged into a Fender piggyback amp, "that he's relied on for more than a decade", and he uses a glass slide, rather than a brass one. "From working with Irish pipers, I've adopted this technique of banging the slide onto the harmonic. So I've had to stop using the brass, because I've only got one more refret on my pink Strat. I've played it so hard that I don't think there's gonna be any wood left," he ruefully acknowledges.

Track listing
All songs written by Chris Rea.

Original track listing
 "Espresso Logic" – 6:54
 "Red" – 5:26
 "Soup of the Day" – 3:45
 "Johnny Needs a Fast Car" – 6:35
 "Between the Devil and the Deep Blue Sea" – 4:50
 "Julia" – 3:55
 "Summer Love" – 4:07
 "New Way" – 3:30
 "Stop" – 5:10
 "She Closed Her Eyes" – 3:55

US track listing
 "Espresso Logic" – 6:53
 "Julia" – 3:54
 "Soup of the Day" – 3:46
 "If You Were Me" (duet with Elton John) – 4:20
 "Johnny Needs a Fast Car" – 6:34
 "Between the Devil and the Deep Blue Sea" – 4:49
 "God's Great Banana Skin" – 5:18
 "Miles Is a Cigarette" – 4:21
 "Summer Love" – 4:04
 "Red" – 5:26
 "She Closed Her Eyes" – 3:56

Personnel
 Chris Rea – vocals, organ, guitars, slide guitar, steel guitar
 Max Middleton – acoustic piano, keyboards
 Robert Ahwai – guitars
 Sylvin Marc – bass
 Martin Ditcham – drums, percussion
 Andy Fairweather-Low – handclaps
 Davy Spillane – Uilleann pipes
 Pete Beachill – trombone
 Dave Stewart – trombone
 Elton John – lead vocals on "If You Were Me"
 Val Chalmers – backing vocals
 Linda Taylor – backing vocals
 Emma Whittle – backing vocals

Production
 Chris Rea – producer, sleeve concept 
 Neil Amor – engineer
 Stuart Epps – engineer
 Paul Mortimer – engineer
 Simon Wall – assistant engineer
 Tommy Willis – guitar technician
 Willie Grimston – coordination
 Stylorouge – artwork
 Stephen Sandon – sleeve photography

Studios
 Recorded at The Mill (Berkshire, England)
 Mixed at Outside Studios (Oxfordshire, England)

Charts

Weekly charts

Year-end charts

Certifications

References

1993 albums
Chris Rea albums
East West Records albums